The Kalmunai massacre refers to a series of mass killings that occurred in June 1990 in Kalmunai, a municipality within the Ampara District of Sri Lanka's Eastern Province. The massacre of civilians was allegedly carried out by the Sri Lankan Army in retaliation for an earlier massacre of Sri Lankan police officers. The University Teachers for Human Rights, a human rights organization, put the number of dead in the second massacre at 250, while a local Member of Parliament claimed that at least 160 people were killed.

Civilian massacre
After the LTTE massacred the police officers on 11 June 1990, the town of Kalmunai was allegedly subjected to intense shelling by the Army. As a result, the LTTE withdrew from the town. Subsequently, once the Army had occupied the town, the massacre of civilians began on 20 June 1990. One account claimed that Sri Lankan Army personnel took position at Kalmunai Rest House junction where Tamil civilians were allegedly kidnapped. The abducted were then allegedly burned behind the shops of Muslim businessmen. While the exact death toll is disputed, a member of Sri Lanka's parliament alleged that more than 160 people were killed. However, the UTHR said that the number of people who died or disappeared was in excess 1,000 and alleged that over 250 were killed. It further alleged that this massacre was the "largest bout of slaughter a single town in the island had witnessed in such a short time".

Later attacks 
On 27 June 1990, 75 people were allegedly rounded by the Sri Lankan Army and later burned and a further 27 headless bodies washed ashore Kalmunai beach. In all, the UTHR allege that 7,000 people were killed in June.

References

Further reading
 Gunaratna, Rohan. (1998). Sri Lanka's Ethnic Crisis and National Security, Colombo: South Asian Network on Conflict Research. 
 Gunaratna, Rohan. (October 1, 1987). War and Peace in Sri Lanka: With a Post-Accord Report From Jaffna, Sri Lanka: Institute of Fundamental Studies. 
 Gunasekara, S.L. (November 4, 2003). The Wages of Sin, 

Attacks on civilians attributed to the Sri Lanka Army
Massacres in Sri Lanka
Massacres in 1990
Mass murder of Sri Lankan Tamils
Sri Lankan government forces attacks in Eelam War II
Terrorist incidents in Sri Lanka in 1990
June 1990 events in Asia
1990 murders in Sri Lanka